Wanderson is a given name. Notable people with the name include:

Wanderson de Paula Sabino, known as Somália (born 1977), Brazilian striker
Wanderson (footballer, born 1980), full name Wanderson Pereira Rodrigues, Brazilian football midfielder
Wánderson (footballer, born 1986), full name Francisco Wánderson do Carmo Carneiro, Brazilian football midfielder
Wanderson Cafu (born 1986), full name Wanderson Gustavo da Silva, Brazilian football right-back
Wanderson Souza Carneiro known as Baiano (born 1987), Brazilian football right-back
Wanderson (footballer, born 1988), full name Wanderson Cristaldo Farias, Bulgarian football attacking midfielder
Wanderson (footballer, born 1989), full name Wanderson Carvalho de Oliveira, Brazilian football wingback
Wanderson (footballer, born 1990), full name Wanderson Miranda Francisco, Brazilian football midfielder
Wanderson (footballer, born February 1991), full name Wanderson Santos Pereira, Brazilian football centre-back
Wanderson (footballer, born September 1991), full name Wanderson Henrique do Nascimento Silva, Brazilian football left-back
Wanderson (footballer, born 1992), full name Wanderson de Macedo Costa, Brazilian football forward
Wanderson (footballer, born February 1994), full name Wanderson Costa Viana, Brazilian football winger
Wanderson (footballer, born October 1994), full name Wanderson Maciel Sousa Campos, Brazilian football winger

See also
Anderson (disambiguation)
Vanderson